Lichenaula is a genus of Australian moth of the family Xyloryctidae.

The genus was first published by amateur entomologist Edward Meyrick in 1890.

Species
Lichenaula afflictella (Walker, 1864)
Lichenaula appropinquans T.P. Lucas, 1901
Lichenaula arisema Meyrick, 1890
Lichenaula calligrapha Meyrick, 1890
Lichenaula callispora Turner, 1904
Lichenaula choriodes Meyrick, 1890
Lichenaula circumsignata T.P. Lucas, 1900
Lichenaula comparella (Walker, 1864)
Lichenaula drosias Lower, 1899
Lichenaula fumata Turner, 1898
Lichenaula goniodes Turner, 1898
Lichenaula ignota Turner, 1898
Lichenaula laniata Meyrick, 1890
Lichenaula lichenea Meyrick, 1890
Lichenaula lithina Meyrick, 1890
Lichenaula maculosa (Turner, 1898)
Lichenaula melanoleuca Turner, 1898
Lichenaula mochlias Meyrick, 1890
Lichenaula musica Meyrick, 1890
Lichenaula neboissi F.G. Neumann, 1970
Lichenaula onychodes Turner, 1898
Lichenaula onychotypa Turner, 1939
Lichenaula pelodesma (Lower, 1899)
Lichenaula petulans T.P. Lucas, 1900
Lichenaula phloeochroa Turner, 1898
Lichenaula provisa Lucas, 1900
Lichenaula selenophora Lower, 1892
Lichenaula terminata (Meyrick, 1921)
Lichenaula tholodes Turner, 1900
Lichenaula tortriciformis T.P. Lucas, 1900
Lichenaula tuberculata Meyrick, 1890
Lichenaula undulatella (Walker, 1864)

References

 
Moths of Australia
Xyloryctidae genera
Xyloryctidae